X-Kaliber 2097 is a Super NES action video game published by Activision. It was developed by Japanese studios Fupac and Winds.

The game takes place in the near-anarchic future of the year 2097, in which the world's economy has been devastated, governments have collapsed, and organized crime has gained dramatic influence. In X-Kaliber 2097, the player guides a swordsman named Slash through a side-scrolling environment. Boss encounters take place as one-on-one matches in the style of versus fighting games.

Soundtrack

X-Kaliber 2097s American soundtrack was by electronic/industrial music group Psykosonik and arranged for Activision by Ali Lexa. Psykosonik's soundtrack became an unusually prominent part of the game's marketing, and was often plugged in marketing blurbs. The soundtrack is also mentioned on the game packaging, and has its own section in the game manual.

The Japanese version features music by Hitoshi Sakimoto and Hayato Matsuo, as well as a completely different storyline and script (with different names for every character) compared to the ones that were given in the English localization of the game.

Characters
Slash (Gear in Japan)
The main protagonist and the current owner of the legendary sword, X-Kaliber. His goal is to bring peace and order to the world. Many of his enemies, especially Raptor, wish to acquire his sword for their own dastardly purposes. In the original Japanese version of the game, Gear is a prisoner serving a homicide sentence, chosen to carry out the New York mission by the US Government.
Alix (Cynthia in Japan)
Slash's female partner. Alix is taken hostage by Raptor as a bargaining chip for X-Kaliber. Later, Alix becomes a vessel for Krux's consciousness. Alix is freed when Krux was defeated.
Raptor (Zieg Dyne in Japan)
The warlord ruler of Neo New York. He has terrorized the city into submission and imposes order with the aid of the Morphs, a mysterious race of powerful, monstrous beings. He claims to be the brother of Slash and even carries his own mystic sword, though this weapon was inferior when compared to X-Kaliber. Unknown to all but himself, Raptor has secured the aid of an alien gangster named Krux.
Kane (Cocktail in Japan)
Raptor's lieutenant. Kane is the only person privy to Raptor's secret plans. He also deals with the many criminal elements under Raptor's control. In combat, Kane uses his cane like a sword and can throw his hat like a flying blade.
Tattoo (Tattoo Man in Japan)
A large green-skinned humanoid with a tattoo of a rose on his chest. He carries a large sword and can sprout vines from his rose tattoo as a form of offense. A steel mask covers the lower half of his face. Tattoo serves Kane as a chief enforcer and assassin. He bears a slight resemblance to Blanka of Street Fighter II fame.
Chainsaw (TT in Japan)
An android that looks human at first, but later his robotic nature becomes obvious as he takes damage in combat (similar to the Terminator). Chainsaw carries a large machine gun in his human appearance, but his right arm becomes a real chainsaw later in combat.
Dr. Blast (Dr. Mad in Japan)
An insane scientist who serves as Raptor's chief scientist. Dr. Blast performs research on the Morphs, seeking better ways for them to serve Raptor's needs. When he encounters Slash, Dr. Blast carries a sample of experimental insect DNA serum. When he consumes this sample, he mutates into a human-sized amalgamation of several insects and arachnids, including a mosquito, a dragonfly, a scorpion, and a spider.
Spuke (Creapy in Japan)
Krux's lieutenant. A pale blue-skinned humanoid with long blonde hair and wearing a jester's costume. He claims that Slash's sword, X-Kaliber, once belonged to Krux and intends to retrieve it.
Krux (Maou in Japan)
An alien crime lord from outer space (a demon king in the original). He makes a deal with Raptor to secure his aid in taking over the world. In fact, the Morphs are from Krux's retinue. Krux's ultimate goal is to capture every resource on Earth for his own selfish purposes, to use up or destroy as he pleases.

Notes

References

External links
X-Kaliber 2097 at GameFAQs

1994 video games
Action video games
Activision games
Cyberpunk video games
Platform games
Super Nintendo Entertainment System games
Super Nintendo Entertainment System-only games
Toshiba EMI games
Video games scored by Hayato Matsuo
Video games scored by Hitoshi Sakimoto
Video games developed in Japan
Video games set in the 2090s
2097
Single-player video games